Yatarō, Yataro or Yatarou is a masculine Japanese given name.

Possible writings
Yatarō can be written using different combinations of kanji characters. Here are some examples:

The characters used for "taro" (太郎) literally means "thick (big) son" and usually used as a suffix to a masculine name, especially for the first son. The "ya" part of the name can use a variety of characters, each of which will change the meaning of the name ("矢" for arrow, "野" for field, "弥" and so on).

矢太郎, "arrow, big son"
野太郎, "field, big son"
弥太郎, "more and more, big son"
彌太郎, "more and more, big son"
八太郎, "eight, big son"
夜太郎, "night, big son"

Other combinations...

矢太朗, "arrow, thick, bright"
矢多朗, "arrow, many, bright"
勇汰朗, "bravery, excessive, bright"
野太朗, "field, thick, bright"
弥太朗, more and more, thick, bright"

The name can also be written in hiragana やたろう or katakana ヤタロウ.

Notable people with the given name Yoshitaka
, Japanese businessman
, Japanese samurai
, Japanese actor
, Japanese businessman and banker
, Japanese politician

Japanese masculine given names